Quartet West is an album by the American jazz bassist Charlie Haden recorded in 1986 and released on the Verve label.

Reception 
The Allmusic review by Stacia Proefrock awarded the album 5 stars, stating, "While the album may not be stretching many boundaries stylistically, this format does little to dilute Haden's impressive performances, and his love for this material is made obvious with his intricate arrangements".

Track listing 
All compositions by Charlie Haden except as indicated
 "Hermitage" (Pat Metheny) - 7:59 
 "Body and Soul" (Frank Eyton, Johnny Green, Edward Heyman, Robert Sour) - 6:19 
 "The Good Life" (Ornette Coleman) - 4:39 
 "In the Moment" - 6:06 
 "Bay City" - 6:46 
 "My Foolish Heart" (Ned Washington, Victor Young) - 6:47 
 "Passport" (Charlie Parker) - 4:45 
 "Taney County" - 7:39 
 "The Blessing" (Coleman) - 5:50 
 "Passion Flower" (Billy Strayhorn) - 4:53 
Recorded at Producers 1 & 2 in Los Angeles, California on December 22 and 23, 1986

Personnel
Charlie Haden – bass
Ernie Watts - soprano saxophone, alto saxophone, tenor saxophone
Alan Broadbent - piano
Billy Higgins - drums

References 

Verve Records albums
Charlie Haden albums
1987 albums